Harbottle is a village in Northumberland, England.

Harbottle may also refer to:

 Sir Harbottle Grimston, 1st Baronet (c.1569–1648), MP for Essex 1626 and 1628–1629
 Sir Harbottle Grimston, 2nd Baronet (1603–1685), English politician
 Michael Harbottle (1917–1997), British army officer and peace campaigner
 Jeremiah Harbottle, character of deputy stationmaster in 1937 film Oh, Mr Porter!
 Elijah Harbottle, character of judge in the Sheridan Le Fanu short story "Mr. Justice Harbottle", collected in In a Glass Darkly (1872)

See also
 Foss v Harbottle, 1843 English precedent on corporate law
 R. v. Harbottle, 1993 Canadian case
 Harbottle Castle, in Harbottle village